Michael Heaney is an Irish professional rugby union player for Worcester Warriors, born in Belfast, Northern Ireland. His formative years were spent in Carryduff, Northern Ireland. His favoured position is scrum half. Heaney has represented Ireland at U-20 level. He is also English qualified, although has no senior caps for either Ireland or England.

On 20 February 2018, Heaney signed for Worcester Warriors in the Premiership Rugby on a one-year deal ahead of the 2018-19 season. He signed a two-year contract extension until the end of the 2020-21 season.

References

Irish rugby union players
Ulster Rugby players
1990 births
Living people
People educated at Methodist College Belfast
Rugby union scrum-halves
Rugby union players from Belfast